The twentieth edition of the Caribbean Series (Serie del Caribe) was played in . It was held from February 4 through February 9 with the champions teams from the Dominican Republic, Tigres del Licey; Mexico, Venados de Mazatlán; Puerto Rico, Criollos de Caguas and Venezuela, Navegantes del Magallanes. The format consisted of 12 games, each team facing the other teams twice, and the games were played at UCV Stadium in Caracas, Venezuela.

Summary
The Dominican team was represented by the Tigres del Licey and finished with a perfect record of 6–0. Managed by Buck Rodgers, the team received strong support from Series MVP Rico Carty, who led the hitters in runs (8) and RBI (10), while setting a new Series record with five home runs. Starters Ed Halicki and Odell Jones both earned two wins apiece, and Stan Wall led a bullpen that included Pedro Borbón, Rob Dressler and Ike Hampton. Other players included C Freddie Velázquez, IFs Bob Beall, Mario Guerrero, Ted Martínez and  Rennie Stennett, as well as OFs Jesús Alou, Jim Dwyer, Rafael Landestoy, Manny Mota and Sam Mejías.

The Navegantes del Magallanes of Venezuela were managed by Don Leppert and finished second with a 3–3 record. LF Félix Rodríguez won the batting title (.522) and led the team in RBI (6), while receiving help from RF Mitchell Page (.381, two HRs, five RBI), DH Dave Parker (.346, one HR, three RBI) and 1B Cito Gaston (.300, four RBI). Other than SP Paul Reuschel (2–0, 0.50 ERA, two complete games) and RP Manny Sarmiento (1-0, 3.00 ERA), the pitching staff had an undistinguished performance. Also in the roster were Chris Batton (P), Bo Díaz (C), Jamie Easterly (P), Wayne Granger (P), Gus Gil (IF), Remy Hermoso (DH), Mike Kekich (P), Ken Macha (3B), Oswaldo Olivares (OF), Jimmy Sexton (SS), and Manny Trillo (2B).

Managed by Alfredo Ortiz, the Venados de Mazatlán represented Mexico and went 2–4 to end in third place. The most significant contribution came from LHP George Brunet, who was credited with the two victories of Mexico, a team that batted a paltry .218, including homers by 1B Héctor Espino and OF Jeffrey Leonard, while committing a Series-leading 14 errors. Other members of the roster were Mike Dimmel (OF), Rex Hudson (P), Max León (P), Bobby Treviño (DH) and Ron Washington (SS), among others.
 
The Criollos de Caguas of Puerto Rico finished last with a 1–5 record. Managed by Doc Edwards, the team batted a collective .253 average with five home runs and was outscored by their opponents 33–19, even though the roster was filled with Ps Mike Cuellar, Joe Henderson, Willie Hernández, Eduardo Rodríguez, Mike Krukow, Dennis Martínez and Ed Whitson; IFs Kurt Bevacqua, Julio González, Félix Millán and Eddie Murray; OFs José Cruz, Sixto Lezcano and Jerry Morales; C John Wockenfuss, and utilities Iván de Jesús, José Morales and Tony Scott.

Scoreboards

Game 1, February 4

Game 2, February 4

Game 3, February 5

Game 4, February 5

Game 5, February 6

Game 6, February 6

Game 7, February 7

Game 8, February 7

Game 9, February 8

Game 10, February 8

Game 11, February 9

Game 12, February 9

See also
Ballplayers who have played in the Series

Sources
Antero Núñez, José. Series del Caribe. Impresos Urbina, Caracas, Venezuela.
Araujo Bojórquez, Alfonso. Series del Caribe: Narraciones y estadísticas, 1949-2001. Colegio de Bachilleres del Estado de Sinaloa, Mexico.
Figueredo, Jorge S. Cuban Baseball: A Statistical History, 1878–1961. Macfarland & Co., United States.
González Echevarría, Roberto. The Pride of Havana. Oxford University Express.
Gutiérrez, Daniel. Enciclopedia del Béisbol en Venezuela, Caracas, Venezuela.

External links
Las Series del Caribe (Spanish)
1977 Caribbean Series statistics
EspnDeportes.com – Campeones de RD en Series del Caribe (Spanish)
BeisbolProfesional.net – Triple Play: Article by Humberto Acosta (Spanish)
Hoy.com.do – Carty impuso récord jonronero en Serie del Caribe de 1977 de Venezuela (Spanish)

Caribbean
Caribbean Series
International baseball competitions hosted by Venezuela
Sports competitions in Caracas
1977 in Venezuelan sport
1977 in Caribbean sport
Caribbean Series
20th century in Caracas